The 1926–27 Ottawa Senators season was the club's tenth season of play in the NHL, 42nd overall.  The Senators would win the Stanley Cup for the fourth time in seven years, and eleventh overall including the pre-NHL years.

Pre-season
Prior to the start of the season, the Senators relieved head coach Alex Currie from his duties. General Manager Dave Gill would step behind the bench and become the head coach. Buck Boucher would take over the team captaincy from Cy Denneny.

Regular season
The league would expand by three teams, as the Chicago Black Hawks, Detroit Cougars and New York Rangers would all join the league to make it a ten-team league.  The NHL also would divide the ten teams into two divisions, and the Senators were placed in the Canadian Division.  This was also the first season that the Stanley Cup was awarded to the champion of the NHL.

The Senators would win 30 games and earn 64 points, both the highest in the NHL and capture the Prince of Wales Trophy, win the Canadian Division title, and earn a bye in the opening round of the playoffs.  Also,

Denneny would go on to lead the club once again offensively, scoring 17 goals and 23 points, while Hooley Smith would have a team record 125 penalty minutes.  Alec Connell would lead the NHL in wins (30) and be among the league leaders in GAA (1.49) and shutouts (13).

Final standings

Record vs. opponents

Schedule and results

Playoffs
The Montreal Canadiens would defeat their cross town rivals, the Montreal Maroons and face the Senators in a two-game total-goal series, and Ottawa would win it by a score of 5–1, and match up against the Boston Bruins in the Stanley Cup Final.

Ottawa Senators 5, Montreal Canadiens 1

Led by Cy Denneny and Alec Connell, the Senators would win a tough four game series over the Bruins, winning the Stanley Cup for the fourth time in seven years. 

Ottawa Senators 2, Boston Bruins 0

Player statistics

Regular season
Scoring

Goaltending

Playoffs
Scoring

Goaltending

Awards and records
 O'Brien Cup
 Prince of Wales Trophy
 Stanley Cup

Transactions
The Senators were involved in the following transactions during the 1926–27 season.

Trades

Free agents signed

Free agents lost

See also
 1926–27 NHL season
 List of Stanley Cup champions

References

SHRP Sports
The Internet Hockey Database
National Hockey League Guide & Record Book 2007

Stanley Cup championship seasons
Ottawa Senators (original) seasons
Ottawa
Ottawa
1927 Stanley Cup